Guillermo Claudio La Rosa Laguna (born June 6, 1952) is a retired football forward from Peru.

He competed for the Peru national football team at the 1978 and 1982 FIFA World Cup, wearing the number nineteen jersey. He’s nicknamed the 'tank' for his corpulence, Guillermo La Rosa scored the last Peruvian goal for 36 years against Poland in a World Cup match in Spain 1982. The 36 year cold streak was finally broken by Andre Carrillo when Peru defeated Australia 2-0 at the 2018 FIFA World Cup held in Russia.

Club career
La Rosa played for Peruvian clubs Defensor Lima, Sport Boys and Alianza Lima where he claimed the title in 1978. That year he was one of the Copa Libertadores top scorers with 8 goals. Between 1979 and 1987 he played for Atletico Nacional, America de Cali, Deportivo Pereira and Cúcuta Deportivo of Colombia.

He retired in 1989, playing for Ecuadorian club Liga de Quito, and currently works as a coach for children in a football academy in Lima.

International career
La Rosa made 39 appearances for the Peru national football team. He retired from international competition after playing the 1982 FIFA World Cup.

Honours

Titles

Individual
 1973 Bolivarian Games Top scorer (11 goals)
 1978 Copa Libertadores Top scorer (8 goals)

See also
1978 FIFA World Cup squads
1982 FIFA World Cup squads

References

External links

 Weltfussball profile  

1952 births
Living people
Footballers from Lima
Association football forwards
Peruvian footballers
Peru international footballers
1978 FIFA World Cup players
1982 FIFA World Cup players
Peruvian Primera División players
Categoría Primera A players
Sport Boys footballers
Club Alianza Lima footballers
Atlético Nacional footballers
América de Cali footballers
Deportivo Pereira footballers
Cúcuta Deportivo footballers
L.D.U. Quito footballers
Peruvian expatriate footballers
Expatriate footballers in Colombia
Expatriate footballers in Ecuador
Peruvian expatriate sportspeople in Colombia
Peruvian expatriate sportspeople in Ecuador